Ġorġ Mallia (born 9 November 1957) is a Maltese communications academic, author and cartoonist.

Education and work 

He has a B.A.(Hons) in English Literature and an M.A. in communications, both from the University of Malta, and a Ph.D. in Instructional Technology, from the University of Sheffield, UK. He specialises in Print and Presentation Media, Personal Communications and Branding, Instructional Design and Technology (particularly Transfer of Learning), and Visual Narrative. Ġorġ Mallia is a  professor of communications, and the Head of the Department of Media and Communications, in the Faculty of Media and Knowledge Sciences at the University of Malta.

Publications, media work and cartoons 
As an author, Ġorġ Mallia has produced mostly children's books, which he has also illustrated. His Pullu series for very young children is very popular in Malta and has introduced countless children to reading in Maltese. He has also written two collections of experimental short stories for adults, a book of microstories (Mitt Ruħ) and a collection of poems. He was editor of the comics series Avventura (Adventure), 1982 and Il-Komik (The Comic), 1983–1984. His books for children also include Ktieb ix-Xwejjaħ (1978), Avventura taħt l-Art (1993), Il-Professur Għasfur (2015), and Sigurd and the Tree of Life (2016). He was co-editor and producer of the children's magazine Sagħtar, and past editor of the short lived national children's magazine HeyU!

Ġorġ Mallia is one of Malta's best known cartoonists. His cartoons have been published in newspapers and magazines throughout the island. From 1993 to 2008 he produced what was then Malta's only regular socio-political comic strip (One Family) in The Sunday Times of Malta. Since 2020 he has produced a comic strip that initially mapped humorously the COVID-19 pandemic in Malta, but then also took on socio-political satire, Żepp. Initially run twice weekly in The Times of Malta, it now appears once a week in The Sunday Times of Malta. He is also well known as a pioneering book illustrator in Malta.

He has published extensively (in Maltese and English) in his academic fields of interest, also producing an edited volume of papers exploring the use of Social Media in Education, The Social Classroom (2014).

Professor Mallia has also produced and presented a number of programmes on Maltese national television and radio. In 1996 he won the Broadcasting Authority Award for excellence in broadcasting for his radio analysis of Maltese humour in the series done for Radju ta' l-Università, "Biex Nidhku" ("What we laugh at").

He was chairman of the National Book Council of Malta between 2005 and 2013. He is one of the organisers of the annual international conference held in Greece on Information Communications Technologies in Education (ICICTE).

Bibliography 
Children's books

 Ktieb ix-Xwejjaħ (1987)
 Avventura taħt l-Art (1993)
 Pullu taħt is-Sodda (2000)
 Pullu u d-Dragun (2001)
 L-Avventura ta’ Pullu (2002)
 Pullu u t-tifla mill-ispazju (2003)
 Il-Kukkudrill Eroj (2004)
 Il-Ħolma ta' Pullu (2005)
 Pullu u d-Dinja Nadifa (2009)
 Avventura madwar l-Ewropa (with Loranne Vella) (2012)
 Il-Professur Għasfur (2015)
 Sigurd and the Tree of Life (2016)
 Melanie and Karl’s Enchanted Adventure (2020)
 L-Avventura Msaħħra ta’ Melanie u Karl (2020)
 Il-Professur Għasfur fl-Ispazju (2021)

Short stories

 Mill-Art ta' Qatt u Qatt (1977)
 Żagħżugħ bla Isem (1985)
 Mitt Ruħ (2020)

Poetry

 My Love Had Eyes of Blue and Dreams (2019)

Graphic Narrative Collections

 Adron, Re (1982)
 Żepp: His Pandemic Years (2022)

Translations

 Peter Pan (from the English original by J.M. Barrie) (1982)
 Milied Imħawwad (with M.L. Kold, from the Swedish original by Ingelin Angerborn and Per Gustavsson) (2019)

Edited collections

 Dwal (1977)
 Taħt Sema Kwiekeb (with Trevor Żahra) (1996)
 Tużżana (with Trevor Żahra) (1997)
 Il-Ħamsin (2021)

Personal life 
Ġorġ Mallia was born in Qormi, Malta, and has lived in Attard, Naxxar and Msida, all in Malta. He has also lived in Malmö, Sweden. Mallia was married twice, to Tanya (née Spiteri), and Danish/Swedish artist Marie Louise Kold. Both marriages ended in divorce. He has two children from his first marriage, Samwel and Liża.

References

Maltese cartoonists
Maltese comics artists
Maltese male writers
Maltese illustrators
Maltese television presenters
Maltese radio personalities
Maltese television producers
Living people
1957 births
Alumni of the University of Sheffield
University of Malta alumni
Academic staff of the University of Malta
Maltese stamp designers
20th-century Maltese writers
21st-century Maltese writers
Maltese children's writers
English-language writers from Malta